Alfred George Richardson (31 March 1878 – 1 December 1951) was an Australian rules footballer who played for the St Kilda Football Club in the Victorian Football League (VFL).

References

External links 

1878 births
1951 deaths
Australian rules footballers from Victoria (Australia)
St Kilda Football Club players
Perth Football Club players